Zoe Buckman (born 21 December 1988) is an Australian runner who has competed nationally and internationally in the 400 metre, 800 metre, 1,500 metre and 5,000 metre events.  She ran for the University of Oregon.  She has also competed at the Junior World Championships, the Australian National Championships, the 2012 Summer Olympics (representing Australia), and the 2013 IAAF World Athletics Championships where she was a finalist in the Women's 1500 metres, the 2016 Olympics, the 2017 World Championships and 2018 Commonwealth Games.

Personal
Buckman was born on 21 December 1988 in Grafton, New South Wales. She attended Canberra Girls' Grammar School. and went to the University of Oregon from 2006 to 2011 where she majored in psychology.

Athletics
Buckman has run in the 400 metres, 800 metres, 1,500 metres and 5,000 metres events.  Her personal best in the 400 metres is 54.62 seconds set in Canberra on 28 March 2004.  Her personal best in the 800 metres is 2:01.60 seconds set in Lignano Sabbiadoro on 16 July 2013.  Her personal best in the 1,500 metres is 4:03.22 seconds set on 27 August 2016, in Paris, France. She is coached by Nic Bideau.

Buckman competed at the Australian Championships in 2005 in the under-20 category.  She finished second in the 400 metre event and first in the 800 metre event.  She competed in the same age category again in 2006, finishing first in the 800 metre event and second in the 1500 metre event.  In 2007, she competed in the under-20 category finishing first in the 800 metres and third in the 1500 metres event.  In 2007, she also competed in the open age category, finishing third in the 800 metre event.  In 2010, she competed in the open age category at the Australian Championships in the 5000 metres, where she finished second.  In 2012, she competed in the 800 metre event where she also finished second.

Buckman competed at the World Junior Championships in 2004, where her 4 × 400 m team finished fifth in the heats.  She competed at the 2006 event, finishing 4th in the 800 metre semi-final and eleventh in the 1500 metre final.

Buckman ran track for the University of Oregon from 2006/2007 to 2010/2011.

Buckman was selected to represent Australia at the 2012 Summer Olympics in the 1500 metre event.  The 2012 London Olympic Games was her Olympic debut.  She was one of ten University of Oregon alumni to compete at the Games. She was eliminated in a semi-final after running a Personal Best time.

In 2013, Buckman qualified fastest for the 1500 metre final at the World Championships in Moscow, Russia with a semi-final win in a Personal Best of 4:04.8 seconds.

She competed for Athletics Australia at the 2014 Commonwealth Games, the 2016 Olympics, the 2017 World Championships and 2018 Commonwealth Games.

References

External links
 
 
 
 
 
 
 

1988 births
Living people
Olympic athletes of Australia
University of Oregon alumni
Australian female sprinters
Australian female middle-distance runners
Sportswomen from New South Wales
Athletes (track and field) at the 2012 Summer Olympics
Athletes (track and field) at the 2016 Summer Olympics
World Athletics Championships athletes for Australia
Athletes (track and field) at the 2014 Commonwealth Games
Athletes (track and field) at the 2018 Commonwealth Games
Commonwealth Games competitors for Australia
ACT Academy of Sport alumni